Petauke is a town and seat of Petauke District located in the Eastern Province of Zambia.

Petauke is 425 km from the capital city Lusaka, roughly halfway between Lusaka and the Malawi border. The main spoken language of the 14,000 residents is Nsenga.

Like the Tonga of southern province, the Nsenga do not know exactly where they came from, although it has been accepted that they were earliest migrants from great Luba-Lunda, probably came following the escarpment together with the Zulu, Shona and other southern African peoples. Unfortunately, this fact is challenged on account of language. Luba groups mostly settled in northern Zambia and part of central Zambia whereas the Lunda groups settled in North western and western Zambia. These groups have similarities in their languages if not they are dialects. But for the nsenga it is unique, actually, it was until the Ngoni marauders settled among them because they were loosely organised. Eventually, the Ngoni "lost" their language.

Most telecommunication is by two local radio stations; Radio PASME, 91.3 and Radio Explorers, 88.1fm, which cover up to 120 km; mainly used by local businessmen, political leaders and traditional chiefs to disseminate their information. The District now has the reception of the three major cellular providers in the country- Airtel, Cell Z and MTN.

The town is situated in an agricultural area; farmers produce maize, cotton, sunflower, groundnut, soya beans and many other crops. Industries include two cotton ginneries, one roofing industry,a number of small scale maize millers and cooking-oil refiners, three breweries, and small scale saw-mills. Government is putting up a milling plant for prisons.

The town has two major health facilities. A district hospital and an urban clinic. There are a few other upcoming privately owned clinics.

The town has three colleges; Ukwimi Trades and two other private colleges. nursing school is  Fairview.

The region around Petauke contains copper, amethyst, and gold. However, the minerals in the region are low grade and no serious mining investment has been made in the region. In the early 17th century, gold was mined and that contributed to high rate of slave trade. Mostly, the Swahili speaking peoples invaded the area.

The town is near the North and South Luangwa National Parks.

Transport 

In 2012, Petauke is on the route of a proposed railway connecting
Chipata on the border with Malawi and connections to a Mozambican Indian Ocean port of Nacala with Serenje, a junction with the TAZARA line.

Accommodation 
 Nyika Motel
 CTV Lodge
 Chimwemwe Hotel
 Eriboma Lodge

See also 

 Railway stations in Zambia

Populated places in Eastern Province, Zambia